Desdemona Sands Light was a lighthouse located on the Pacific coast of the U.S. state of Oregon, at the mouth of the Columbia River to aid navigation of the Columbia Bar.

It was built in 1901
or 1902
as a replacement for Point Adams Light.

with a rooftop tower housing the light and a fog signal.
It was one of the last U.S. wooden pile foundation lighthouses built.
A cistern system collected fresh water.  Only the lightkeeper was present; there was a small boat to reach the mainland, where the keeper's family lived.

The light was electrified in 1934, eliminating the need for a keeper.  It was removed and replaced after World War II by a minor aid on top of a pyramidal structure, which was replaced again in 1955.  The light was removed in 1965.

Desdemona Sands is a group of shoals formerly named Chinook Sands.  In 1857, the bark Desdemona ran aground here and was destroyed.

See also
 List of lighthouses on the Oregon Coast

References

External links 
 Scanned photo of Desdemona Sands Light 

Lighthouses completed in 1902
Lighthouses in Oregon
Oregon Coast
Transportation buildings and structures in Clatsop County, Oregon